The 1991–92 Illinois State Redbirds men's basketball team represented Illinois State University during the 1991–92 NCAA Division I men's basketball season. The Redbirds, led by third year head coach Bob Bender, played their home games at Redbird Arena and competed as a member of the Missouri Valley Conference.

They finished the season 18–11, 14–4 in conference play to finish in a tie for first place. They were the number two seed for the Missouri Valley Conference tournament. They were victorious over Northern Iowa University in their quarterfinal game but were defeated by Southwest Missouri State University in their semifinal game.

Roster

Schedule

|-
!colspan=9 style=|Regular Season

|-
!colspan=9 style=|Diet PepsiMissouri Valley Conference {MVC} tournament

References

Illinois State Redbirds men's basketball seasons
Illinois State
Illinois State Men's Basketball
Illinois State Men's Basketball